is a JR West Geibi and Fukuen Line station located in Takasugi-chō, Miyoshi, Hiroshima Prefecture, Japan.

History
1922-06-07: Shiomachi Station opens 
1934-01-01: The station name is changed from Shiomachi Station to Kamisugi Station
1987-04-01: Japan National Railways is privatized, and Shiomachi Station becomes a JR West station

Station building and platform
Kamisugi Station features one island platform, allowing two trains to be serviced at the same time. The station previously handled freight as well as passenger trains in its large yard. The station building is an older style with wooden shingles. Kamisugi Station is fully automated and unmanned.

Environs
Basen River
Miyoshi Municipal Kamisugi Elementary
Miyoshi Fudoki no Oka, Hiroshima Prefectural Rekishi Minzoku Shiryōkan

Highway access
Japan National Route 184
Japan National Route 375
Hiroshima Prefectural Route 229 (Kamisugi Taishajō Route)
Hiroshima Prefectural Route 432 (Aoga Etakawanouchi Route)

Connecting lines
All lines are JR West lines. 
Geibi Line
Shiomachi Station — Kamisugi Station — Yatsugi Station
Fukuen Line
Shiomachi Station — Kamisugi Station — Yatsugi Station

External links
 JR West

Railway stations in Hiroshima Prefecture
Fukuen Line
Geibi Line
Railway stations in Japan opened in 1922